Lískovice is a municipality and village in Jičín District in the Hradec Králové Region of the Czech Republic. It has about 200 inhabitants.

Administrative parts
The village of Tereziny Dary is an administrative part of Lískovice.

References

Villages in Jičín District